Hallway may refer to:

Architecture
Hallway, a long interior corridor
Lobby (room), an entrance hall

Music
Hallway Productionz music production duo
Grand Hallway American rock band from Seattle
Hallways (Homeboy Sandman album) 2014
Hallway of the Gods, album by The Legendary Pink Dots 1997
"Hallways", song by Australian band Something for Kate from Beautiful Sharks 1999